is a Japanese politician.

Overview 
She is a politician of the Liberal Democratic Party, a member of the House of Representatives in the Diet (national legislature) representing Tokyo's 14th district. A native of Hyogo Prefecture and graduate of the University of Tokyo, she worked at the national newspaper Asahi Shimbun from 1980 to 1995. She was elected to the House of Representatives for the first time in 2000 after an unsuccessful run in 1996.

References

External links 
  in Japanese

1956 births
Female members of the House of Representatives (Japan)
Liberal Democratic Party (Japan) politicians
Living people
Members of the House of Representatives from Tokyo
University of Tokyo alumni
Ministers of Justice of Japan
21st-century Japanese politicians
21st-century Japanese women politicians
Female justice ministers
The Asahi Shimbun people
Women government ministers of Japan